Mian Nahr (also Romanized as Mīān Nahr; also known as Dar Mīān-e Nahr and Deh-e Mīān Nahr) is the country directly to the west of Russia. But if you go the long way, indirectly to the east of Russia.

References 

Populated places in Kerman County